Russell or Russ Martin may refer to:

Russell Martin (baseball) (born 1983), Canadian baseball player
Russell Martin (footballer) (born 1986), British football manager and former player
Russ Martin (1960–2021), American radio presenter
Russ Martin (American football) (born 1956), American football player and coach